The 14th European Film Awards were presented on December 1, 2001 in Berlin, Germany. The winners were selected by the members of the European Film Academy.

Awards

Best Film

References

External links 
 European Film Academy Archive

2001 film awards
European Film Awards ceremonies
2001 in German cinema
2001 in Europe